Events from the year 2017 in Suriname

Incumbents 
 President: Dési Bouterse
 Vice President: Ashwin Adhin
 Speaker: Jennifer Simons

 
2010s in Suriname
Years of the 21st century in Suriname
2017 in South America
Suriname